Ermir Limon Lenjani (born 5 August 1989) is an Albanian professional footballer who plays as a midfielder for Turkish club Ümraniyespor and the Albania national team.

Club career

Early career
Born in Karaçevë, Kamenica to Albanian parents originally from Prokuplje. Lenjani moved to Switzerland as a child, where he started playing football and at age of 11-12 he was asked to play for FC Tössfeld. After spending about 1–2 years at Tosfeld he joined the FC Winterthur academy as a teenager. He broke through into the first team during the 2009–10 season second-half.

Winterthur
On 8 March 2009, Lenjani debuted with Winterthur in the 2008–09 Swiss Challenge League match against Thun and scored the first and last goals in the 50th and 87th minutes, to give his team a 2–4 away victory. Two months after he played his next match on 16 May 2009 against Locarno and scored against a goal in the 34th minute to equal the result 1–1, which was succeeded by a hat-trick of three goals from the Croatian midfielder Tomo Barlecaj and made a 1–4 away victory which came from behind. He played in another 10 matches until the end and finished the season from second-half with total of 12 appearances and 3 goals. The next season, he played the entire season, making a total of 29 appearances in which he scored 6 goals.

Loan to Grasshopper

Lenjani was loaned out to Grasshopper Club Zürich for the first half of the 2010-11 season in order to gain experience. He made it his debut with Grasshopper on 17 July 2010 in the opening match of the 2010–11 Swiss Super League against Neuchâtel Xamax where he came in as a substitute in the 74th minute in place of Steven Lang and the match finished in the 1–1 draw. Lenjani scored 2 goals in a 0–12 destruction over Gumefens/Sorens valid for the 2010–11 Swiss Cup. He played 6 league matches in total for Grasshopper.

Return to Winterthur
He returned to FC Winterthur for the second-half remaining season and established himself as a first team player. He made it 14 league appearances where scored 4 goals. In the 2011–12 Swiss Challenge League he played 25 matches and scored 2 goals. He started another league campaign, the 2012–13 Swiss Challenge League. He played 16 matches and scored 2 goals in the first half of the season.

St. Gallen

He joined Swiss Super League side FC St. Gallen in January 2013. Lenjani gave two assist to give the victory 2–1 St. Gallen against Luzern on 3 August 2014 in a match which came from behind of the 0–1 result in the first half, thanks to Lenjani's assists in the 78th minute for the goal scored by Marco Mathys and for another goal scored by Džengis Čavušević in the 90+3rd minute.

Rennes
While during the winter transfers window German and Italian media talked about agreement reaching with Stuttgart or Verona, but on 5 January 2015, Lenjani signed with the French team of Rennes, after he passed successfully the medical examination. He was presented to the media two days later, where he was assigned squad number 19.

He made his debut with the club on 13 January 2015 by playing as a starter in the quarter-final of the Coupe de la Ligue against Bastia, in where Lenjani left the team with 9 players on the pitch as he received a red card in the 76th minute. Lenjani made it his first league debut on 7 February 2015 by coming on as a substitute in the 71st minute for Pedro Henrique in a 1–1 draw against Olympique de Marseille.

Loan to Nantes

On 17 August 2015, Lenjani moved on loan with the purchase right to fellow French team FC Nantes until the end of the 2015–16 season. He made a dream debut with the club in second week of 2015–16 Ligue 1, scoring the only goal of the match against Stade de Reims in the 76th minute after receiving a pass from Johan Audel.

Sion
On 26 July 2017, Lenjani returned to Switzerland signing for Swiss Super League team FC Sion rejoining his previous assistant coach at Albania, Paolo Tramezzani and he handed the 33 shirt number. In the start of 2018, coach Gabri García decided to reduce the number of players which he liked to collaborate in the first team in a maximum of 20–22 players and consequently Lenjani along 8 fellows were out of his plans; Lenjani was sent in training with the second team of Sion.

On 7 April 2019, Lenjani scored inside ten seconds in Sion's 2–2 draw against Luzern, equaling the record for the fastest ever goal scored in Swiss football. In addition to that, he also set up his team's second goal scored by Roberts Uldriķis.

Return to Grasshopper
On 11 September 2020, he signed a two year contract with Grasshopper Club Zürich. After two years with the club, his contract was not renewed. During his time there, he was instrumental in achieving promotion back to the Swiss Super League.

Ümraniyespor
On 9 June 2022, Lenjani signed with Ümraniyespor in Turkey for one season, with an option for the second year.

International career
Lenjani first announced his desire to represent Albania internationally in January 2013, when he began the procedure to gain Albanian citizenship through his Albanian ethnicity. He was called up by Gianni De Biasi for a friendly against Armenia in August 2013 but did not feature in the game. Lenjani received his Albanian citizenship on 8 October 2013 among Faton Ademi to be eligible to play for Albania even in the competitive matches.

2014 FIFA World Cup qualification
Lenjani was first named by manager Gianni De Biasi in the Albania squad to face Switzerland and Cyprus for the 2014 FIFA World Cup qualifiers. In both occasions he was on bench but did not manage to play as he remained as an unused substitute.

He made his debut for Albania on 15 November 2013 in a friendly match, the first one after the end of the qualification campaign against Belarus playing the full 90 minutes match, which finished in a 0–0 draw. He received another call up for the next friendly match on 5 March 2014 against Malta.

UEFA Euro 2016 campaign

Lenjani received a call-up for the match against Portugal on 7 September 2014, valid for the start of UEFA Euro 2016 qualifiers. He played as a starter against Portugal in a crucial 0–1 away victory with the goal scored by Bekim Balaj in the 52nd minute with a cross from Odise Roshi. On 11 October 2014 in the 2nd Group I match against Denmark, Lenjani managed to score his first international goal in the 38th minute of the match, which ended as a 1–1 draw.

In the next qualifying match three days later away against Serbia, Lenjani played as a started until 42nd minute when the match was postponed due to Serbian fans launching flares onto the pitch. He along with other Albanian players were attacked by Serbian hooligans who came onto the pitch with chairs and other objects. Initially, UEFA awarded Serbia with a 3–0 win, but were deducted three points, leading both Serbia and Albania appeals to the Court of Arbitration for Sport, who on 10 July 2015, awarded Albania with a 3–0 victory and Serbia were still deducted three points.

In the 4th Group I's match against Armenia on 29 March 2015, Lenjani started from the bench because of small physique problems, but anyway the coach Gianni De Biasi chose him among Shkëlzen Gashi to come in to play and by risking not a few but due to an emergency because the result was in disfavor of Albania 0–1 after an accidentally Own goal by Albania's defender Mërgim Mavraj in the 4th minute. In the 70th minute the Armenian defender Hovhannes Hambardzumyan did a bad tackle to Lenjani and the referee David Fernández Borbalán gave him the second yellow card to leave Armenia with 10 men for the rest of the match. This favored Albania too much and 7 minutes later they managed to score with the same Mërgim Mavraj, which previously scored own goal and at this time scored a header after a cross from Taulant Xhaka. Then would come the 81st minute when Lenjani took a pass from the left and crossed into the area where he finds fellow substitute Shkëlzen Gashi who managed to score with a header to overturn the score 2–1 and the match ended in the victory.

On 21 May 2016, Lenjani was named in Albania's preliminary 27-man squad for UEFA Euro 2016, and in Albania's final 23-man UEFA Euro 2016 squad on 31 May.

On 28 May, he scored his first third international goal during the Euro 2016 warm-up match against Qatar, which ended in a 3–1 win.

Lenjani played all Group A matches as a starter where he completed 2 full 90-minutes matches against Switzerland which they lost 1–0 in the opening match and hosts of France against which they lost 2–0 and was substituted off in the 77th minute for Odise Roshi against Romania where Albania beat them 1–0 in the closing match with a goal by Armando Sadiku. Albania finished the group in the third position with three points and with a goal difference –2, and was ranked last in the third-placed teams, which eventually eliminated them.

Post-UEFA Euro 2016
In March 2019, after not receiving a call-up by manager Christian Panucci for the opening UEFA Euro 2020 qualifying matches against Turkey and Andorra, Lenjani announced that he will not accept any invitations in the future as long as Panucci is in charge. He was sacked following the loss against Turkey at Loro Boriçi Stadium, which prompted Lenjani to resume his international career again.

Career statistics

Club

International

Scores and results list Albania's goal tally first, score column indicates score after each Lenjani goal.

References

External links

 Ermir Lenjani at FSHF.org
 Nanes official profile
 
 
 
 
 Ermir Lenjani at Topforward

1989 births
People from Kamenica, Kosovo
Kosovo Albanians
Living people
Albanian footballers
Albania international footballers
Association football midfielders
Association football defenders
Kosovan footballers
FC Winterthur players
Grasshopper Club Zürich players
FC St. Gallen players
Stade Rennais F.C. players
FC Nantes players
FC Sion players
Ümraniyespor footballers
Swiss 1. Liga (football) players
Swiss Challenge League players
Swiss Super League players
Ligue 1 players
Championnat National 2 players
Süper Lig players
UEFA Euro 2016 players
Albanian expatriate footballers
Expatriate footballers in Switzerland
Albanian expatriate sportspeople in Switzerland
Expatriate footballers in France
Albanian expatriate sportspeople in France
Expatriate footballers in Turkey
Albanian expatriate sportspeople in Turkey